Thai coup d'état or Siamese coup d'état may refer one of the following:

 Palace Revolt of 1912
 Siamese revolution of 1932
 1933 Siamese coup d'état
 Boworadet rebellion (1933)
 Songsuradet Rebellion (1939)
 April 1933 Siamese coup d'état
 June 1933 Siamese coup d'état
 Siamese coup d'état of 1947
 Siamese coup d'état of 1948
 Palace Rebellion (1949)
 Manhattan Rebellion (1951)
 Silent Coup (Thailand) (1951)
 1957 Thai coup d'état
 1958 Thai coup d'état
 1971 Thai coup d'état
 1976 Thai coup d'état
 October 1977 Thai coup d'état
 1991 Thai coup d'état
 2006 Thai coup d'état
 2014 Thai coup d'état

See also
 List of coups d'état and coup attempts by country#Thailand